The Bismarck Sea lies in the southwestern Pacific Ocean within the nation of Papua New Guinea. It is located northeast of the island of New Guinea and south of the Bismarck Archipelago.  It has coastlines in districts of the Islands Region, Momase Region, and Papua Region.

Geography
Like the Bismarck Archipelago, it is named in honour of the first German Chancellor Otto von Bismarck. The Bismarck Archipelago extends round to the east and north of the sea, enclosing the Bismarck Sea and separating it from the Southern Pacific Ocean. To the south it is linked to the Solomon Sea by the Vitiaz Strait.

Official boundaries

The International Hydrographic Organization defines the Bismarck Sea as "that area of the South Pacific Ocean off the northeast coast of New Guinea", with the following limits:

On the North and East. By the Northern and Northeastern coasts of the islands of New Ireland, New Hanover, the Admiralty Islands, Hermit Island, and the Ninigo Group, through Manu and Aua Islands to Wuvulu Island and thence a line to Baudissin Point in New Guinea (142°02'E).

On the Southeast. A line from the Southern point of New Ireland along the parallel of 4°50' South to the coast of New Britain, along its Northern coast and thence a line from its Western extreme through the Northern point of Umboi Island to Teliata Point, New Guinea

On the Southwest. By the Northeast coast of New Guinea.

Mineral wealth
Recent explorations in the Bismarck Sea seabed have yielded discoveries of mineral-rich beds of sulfides, copper, zinc, silver and gold. These findings are especially important because they lie in shallow, calm waters. Papua New Guinea owns the mining rights to these minerals under international law.

Important Bird Area
Some 5,200 km2 of the Bismarck Sea, between the north-eastern end of New Britain and New Ireland, has been recognised as an Important Bird Area (IBA) by BirdLife International because it apparently supports a population of Beck's petrels, following sightings at sea of this rare and enigmatic species, of which the breeding grounds remain undiscovered.

History
It was the site of a major Japanese naval defeat in the Battle of the Bismarck Sea during World War II on 3 and 4 March 1943.

See also

Karkar Island

References

External links
CombinedFleet.com: Battle of Bismarck Sea
BattleforAustralia.org: Battle of the Bismarck Sea
ABC.net.au: The Battle of the Bismarck Sea

 
Marginal seas of the Pacific Ocean
Bodies of water of Papua New Guinea
Bismarck
Islands Region (Papua New Guinea)
Momase Region
Southern Region, Papua New Guinea

Geography of Milne Bay Province
Geography of New Britain
Morobe Province
Oro Province
Important Bird Areas of Papua New Guinea
Important Bird Areas of Oceania